Whippoorwill Creek is a stream in Montgomery County in the U.S. state of Missouri. It is a tributary of Loutre River.

Whippoorwill Creek was so named on account of Eastern whip-poor-wills near its course.

See also
List of rivers of Missouri

References

Rivers of Montgomery County, Missouri
Rivers of Missouri